Ronks is a small unincorporated farming community and census-designated place (CDP) in East Lampeter Township, Lancaster County, Pennsylvania, United States, just west of Paradise. As of the 2010 census the population was 362.

The community is the home of Ronks Concrete Company and has a large Amish and Mennonite population. The Ronks ZIP code of 17572 covers a much larger area than the CDP, extending south into Strasburg Township and east into Leacock Township. Within this larger area are several Amish-themed tourist attractions, shops, restaurants, and lodging.

Geography
Ronks is in east-central Lancaster County, in the eastern part of East Lampeter Township. It is bordered to the north by Bird-in-Hand and to the southeast by Soudersburg. U.S. Route 30, the Lincoln Highway, forms the southern edge of the community, with the center of Ronks  to the north along Ronks Road.

Ronks drains west toward Mill Creek and is part of the Conestoga River watershed.

References

External links

Populated places in Lancaster County, Pennsylvania